This article contains information about the literary events and publications of 1716.

Events
April 5 – Anne Lefèvre, Madame Dacier, meets Antoine Houdar de la Motte in person.
May – Voltaire is exiled to Tulle as a result of his lampoon on the regent of France, Philippe II, Duke of Orléans
June 21 – Work begins on construction of the Codrington Library at All Souls College, Oxford, to the design of Nicholas Hawksmoor; it will be completed in 1751.
unknown dates
Poet John Byrom returns to Britain to teach his own system of shorthand.
Edmund Curll renews his controversy with Matthew Prior by publishing more of the poet's works without permission.
The first printed version of the Epic of King Gesar, a Mongolian text, is published in Beijing.

New books

Prose
Richard Blackmore – Essays upon Several Subjects vol. i
Thomas Browne – Christian Morals
Francis Chute (as Mr. Gay) – The Petticoat (part of Edmund Curll's "phantom Gay" hoax)
Anthony Ashley Cooper, 3rd Earl of Shaftesbury – Several Letters... to a Young Man at the University
John Dennis – A True Character of Mr. Pope, and his Writings (in response to The Essay on Criticism)
Theophilus Evans – Drych y Prif Oesoedd (Mirror of the Early Centuries)
Amédée-François Frézier – Relation du voyage de la Mer du Sud, aux côtes du Chili, du Pérou et de Brésil
John Oldmixon – Memoirs of Ireland from the Restoration to the Present Times
Alexander Pope – The Iliad of Homer vol. ii
Humphrey Prideaux – The Old and New Testament Connected in the History of the Jews and Neighbouring Nations
Jean de la Roque – Voyage dans l’Arabie heureuse
Andreas Rüdiger – Göttliche Physik (Divine Physics)
George Sewell – A Vindication of the English Stage
Johann Georg Walch – Historia critica Latinae linguae
Zhang Yushu, Chen Tingjing et al. (ed.) – Kangxi Dictionary (康熙字典)

Drama
Joseph Addison – The Drummer
Barton Booth – The Death of Dido
Christopher Bullock
 The Cobbler of Preston
 Woman Is a Riddle
José de Cañizares
El dómine Lucas
Marta la Romarantina
El picarillo de España, señor de la Gran Canaria
Susanna Centlivre – The Cruel Gift
Mary Davys – The Northern Heiress
Benjamin Griffin – The Humours of Purgatory
Aaron Hill – The Fatal Vision
John Hughes – Apollo and Daphne
Charles Johnson – The Cobbler of Preston, a rival version to that by Bullock (political satire based on The Taming of the Shrew)
William Taverner – Everybody Mistaken
Lewis Theobald – The Perfidious Brother

Poetry
Jane Brereton – The Fifth Ode of the Fourth Book of Horace Imitated
John Gay – Trivia, or The Art of Walking the Streets of London
Lady Mary Wortley Montagu – Court Poems
Lewis Theobald – The Odyssey of Homer
See also 1716 in poetry

Births
January 20 – Jean-Jacques Barthélemy, French writer and numismatist (died 1795)
March 6 – Pehr Kalm, Swedish/Finnish botanist, naturalist and travel writer (died 1779)
December 25 – Johann Jakob Reiske, German scholar and physician (died 1774)
December 26
Thomas Gray, English poet (died 1771)
Jean François de Saint-Lambert, French poet, philosopher and military officer (died 1803)
unknown date – Yosa Buson (与謝 蕪村), Japanese Edo period haiku poet and painter (died 1784)

Deaths
January 5
Jean Chardin, French travel writer (born 1643)
Hippolyte Hélyot, French historian (born 1660)
January 11
Pierre Jurieu, French Protestant writer (born 1637)
René Massuet, French editor (born 1666)
February 19 – Dorothe Engelbretsdotter, Norwegian poet (born 1634)
July 24 – Agnes Campbell, Scottish printer (born 1637)
September 15 – Andrew Fletcher, Scottish politician and writer (born 1653)
October 21 – Jakob Gronovius, Dutch scholar (born 1645)
November 14 – Gottfried Leibniz, German mathematician and philosopher (born 1646)
December 31 – William Wycherley, English dramatist (born 1641)
probable year - Patrick Abercromby, Scottish antiquary and translator (born 1656)

References

 
Years of the 18th century in literature